3344 Peachtree is a 50-story high-rise building of  height located in Atlanta's uptown business district of Buckhead on Peachtree Road, the northern extension of Peachtree Street. The building is a mixed-use tower that incorporates upscale dining, office space, and 82 condominia at 3344 Peachtree Road. Completed in the spring of 2008, it is the ninth tallest building in Atlanta and the tallest mixed-use building in Atlanta. It has also surpassed the Park Avenue Condominiums as the tallest building in Atlanta not to be located downtown or midtown. The building is owned by Cousins Properties of Atlanta, Georgia.

Sovereign
Sovereign, the residential portion of 3344 Peachtree, will contain 82 homes between the 28th and 50th floors of the building. They will all be luxury units, with starting prices at $1 million. Artist Todd Murphy has been hired to decorate the building, including some of his own original pieces. It includes a French bistro, Bistro Niko.

Tower Place
It is part of the Tower Place complex which includes the 401 ft Tower Place 100, and the 451 ft Buckhead Grand.

See also
List of tallest buildings in Atlanta

References

External links 
 
SOVEREIGN website
Emporis entry

Skyscraper office buildings in Atlanta
Residential condominiums in the United States
Residential skyscrapers in Atlanta
Mixed-use development condominiums